Frontside Rock'n'Roll is the fourth album by the Norwegian rock band BigBang, which was released in 2002.

Overview
This is the first album to be published outside Norway. Warner Music Germany also re-released the previous full-length Clouds Rolling By in the country. The first record to be released in Germany was actually Girl In Oslo EP '01 edition, also known as "Girl In Oslo (Europe)".

Øystein Greni wrote the song "Frontside Rock 'n' Roll" as a tribute to two of his skater friends, who had died the same year. "Frontside Rock 'n' Roll" is also the name of a skateboard trick, a discipline which Greni is a former European champion of. The song uses various skateboard trick references.

"Fire & Oil" is a song co-written with Nikolai Eilertsen and documenting on the 11th of September 2001 events from the point of view of a kamikaze pilot. "Earphones" is an homage to Ray Charles. "One of a Kind" is dedicated to his friend the Norwegian film director Joachim Trier (hence the line "for my fiend Jo"). "Mercedes" is dedicated to 'M.E.O.' (Maria Eva Orieta) a performer from Argentina and Greni's then fiancee.

Track listing
 "One of a Kind" – 4:23
 "Fire and Oil" – 4:23
 "Heaven and Stars Above" – 4:04
 "Spiritual Heart Surgery" – 2:52
 "Liquid Gold" – 3:33
 "Mercedes" – 2:49
 "Where the World Comes To An End" – 4:46
 "Earphones" – 3:23
 "The Elephant Man" – 3:49
 "Frontside Rock'n'Roll" – 5:24

Personnel
Øystein Greni - Lead vocals, guitars, piano, mandolin, woodwinds, drums, percussion
Nikolai Eilertsen - Bass, organ, piano, harmonica, brass, percussion, vocals
Olaf Olsen - drums, percussion
Stig Morten Sørheim - Percussion, vocals
Karim Sayed - vocals
Lars Håvard Haugen - guitar solo on #3

References

2002 albums
Bigbang (Norwegian band) albums